For 1979 in television, see:

1979 in American television
1979 in Australian television
1979 in Austrian television
1979 in Belgian television
1979 in Brazilian television
1979 in British television
1979 in Canadian television
1979 in Croatian television
1979 in Danish television
1979 in Dutch television
1979 in Estonian television
1979 in German television
1979 in Irish television
1979 in Japanese television
1979 in New Zealand television
1979 in Philippine television
1979 in Scottish television
1979 in Singapore television
1979 in South African television